Garfield is a New Jersey Transit train station served by the Bergen County Line in the city of Garfield. Located north of a trestle over Midland Avenue (County Route 67), the station consists of two low-level platforms with a shelter and a pair of ticket vending machines.

Garfield station has hourly weekday inbound service to Hoboken Terminal/Secaucus Junction until the afternoon, with the last train leaving Garfield before 4:00 pm. Return service continues all day, with the last train stopping at approximately 1:00 am. Weekend service operates on a more frequent basis inbound.

History
In recent years, both stations in Garfield were relatively bare bones in structure. The station depot at Garfield burned down in 1973. However, Plauderville saw more commuters due to its ample amount of parking. In 2011, however, NJT gave Plauderville station a major overhaul by building high level platforms, making the station fully handicap accessible, and added more frequent service; which resulted in increased ridership at Plauderville. However ridership diminished again and service was scaled back .

Station layout

The station has two tracks, each with a low-level side platform.

Parking is also very limited, as there are only bicycle racks on the Hoboken-bound platform and no street automobile parking. Pedestrian access is available via two staircases on Passaic Street, and at grade level on Somerset Street which runs near the end of the platforms.

Bibliography

References

External links

 Passaic Street station entrance (inbound platform stairs) from Bing Maps Streetside
 Midland Avenue station entrance (outbound platform stairs) via Google Street View

Garfield, New Jersey
NJ Transit Rail Operations stations
Railway stations in Bergen County, New Jersey
Former Erie Railroad stations
1881 establishments in New Jersey
Railway stations opened in 1881